Stardust may refer to:

 A type of cosmic dust, composed of particles in space

Entertainment

Songs
 “Stardust” (1927 song), by Hoagy Carmichael
 “Stardust” (David Essex song), 1974
 “Stardust” (Lena Meyer-Landrut song), 2012
 “Stardust” (Mika song), 2012
 'Stardust' (composition), by Jean-Michel Jarre and Armin van Buuren, 2015
 “Stardust”, by Carly Simon from Come Upstairs, 1980
 “Stardust”, by Officium Triste from Ne Vivam, 1997
 “Stardust”, by The Caretaker from We'll All Go Riding on a Rainbow, 2003
 “Stardust”, by Galneryus from Reincarnation, 2008
 “Stardust”, by Amaranthe from The Nexus, 2013
 “Stardust”, by Gemini Syndrome from Lux, 2013
 “Stardust”, by Delain from The Human Contradiction, 2014
 “Stardust”, by IAMX from Alive In New Light, 2018

Albums
 Stardust (Ron Carter album), 2001
 Stardust (Natalie Cole album), 1996
 Stardust (John Coltrane album), 1963
 Stardust (Benny Golson album), 1987
 Stardust (Lena album), 2012
 Stardust (Willie Nelson album), 1978
 Stardust: The Great American Songbook, Volume III, by Rod Stewart, 2004
 Star Dust (Bing Crosby album), 1940
 Star Dust (Pat Boone album), 1958

Books and comics
 Stardust (Gaiman novel), a 1998 fantasy novel by Neil Gaiman
 Stardust (Serafin book), a 2007 posthumous collection of memoirs and essays by Bruce Serafin
 Stardust (Parker novel), a 1990 novel by Robert Parker
 Star Dust (book),  a 2005 collection of poetry by Frank Bidart
 Stardust (Marvel Comics), a character first appearing in 2005
 Stardust the Super Wizard, a Fox Comics superhero first appearing in 1939
 Stardust Crusaders, the third story arc of the Japanese manga series JoJo's Bizarre Adventure

Film, theater and television

 Star Dust (film), a 1940 comedy drama directed by Walter Lang
 Stardust (1974 film), a British musical drama directed by Michael Apted
 Stardust (miniseries), a 2006 Irish miniseries
 Stardust (2007 film), a British and American romantic fantasy adapted from the Neil Gaiman novel
 Stardust (2020 film), a Canadian–British biographical film of David Bowie

Other entertainment
 Stardust (band), a 1990s French house music supergroup
 Stardust (magazine), an Indian Bollywood magazine published in English and Hindi
 Stardust (1993 video game), an Asteroids-like game, initially for the Amiga
 Stardust (1987 video game), a top-scrolling shooter released by Kixx in 1987
 Stardust, one of the ring names for professional wrestler Cody Rhodes (born 1985)
 Timeless (radio network), originally called Stardust

Other uses
 Stardust (spacecraft), a NASA mission to investigate the comet Wild 2
 Star Dust (aircraft), a British airliner that disappeared in 1947
 Stardust fire, a 1981 fire in the Stardust nightclub in Dublin
 Stardust project, EU research on space junk and asteroids
 Stardust@home, a citizen science project
 Stardust Resort and Casino, a former casino resort which was located in Las Vegas, Nevada

See also
 Stardust (comics)
 Starduster (disambiguation)
 Starlight (disambiguation)
 Space dust (disambiguation)